Giuliano Regolanti (born 26 July 1994) is an Italian football player. He plays for Montegiorgio in Serie D.

Club career
He made his professional debut in the Lega Pro for Gubbio on 30 August 2014 in a game against L'Aquila.

References

External links
 

1994 births
People from Anzio
Living people
Italian footballers
A.S. Gubbio 1910 players
Serie C players
Matera Calcio players
A.C. Prato players
Latina Calcio 1932 players
Paganese Calcio 1926 players
S.S. Arezzo players
Serie B players
Association football forwards
Footballers from Lazio
Sportspeople from the Metropolitan City of Rome Capital